Mimandria cataractae is a moth of the family Geometridae first described by Louis Beethoven Prout in 1917. It is found in Kenya, South Africa and Zimbabwe.

Subspecies
Mimandria cataractae cataractae
Mimandria cataractae rhusiodocha Prout, 1934

References

Pseudoterpnini
Moths of Africa
Moths described in 1917
Taxa named by Louis Beethoven Prout